Nodularia is a genus of filamentous nitrogen-fixing cyanobacteria, or blue-green algae. They occur mainly in brackish or salinic waters, such as the hypersaline Makgadikgadi Pans, the Peel-Harvey Estuary in Western Australia or the Baltic Sea. Nodularia cells occasionally form heavy algal blooms. Some strains produce a cyanotoxin called nodularin R, which is harmful to humans.

The type species for the genus is Nodularia spumigena Mertens ex Bornet & Flahault, 1886.

Morphology
Nodularia may form solitary filaments or groups of filaments. They reproduce by the formation of hormogonia, filament breakage, and by akinetes .

See also
Kruger, T., Oelmuller, R., and Luckas, B. (2009) Comparative PCR analysis of toxic Nodularia spumigena and non-toxic Nodularia harveyana (Nostocales, Cyanobacteria) with respect to the nodularia synthetase gene cluster. Eur. J. Phycol. 44 (3): 291 - 295.

References
C. Michael Hogan (2008) Makgadikgadi, The Megalithic Portal, ed. Andy Burnham
Jiří Komárek and Tomáš Hauer Cyano Database of genera: Nodularia
Martin Dworkin and Stanley Falkow (2006) The Prokaryotes: a handbook on the biology of bacteria, Published by Springer,

Line notes

Nostocales
Cyanobacteria genera